Ludwig Ruff (29 May 187815 August 1934) was an architect in Germany. Born in Dollnstein, he was the father of Franz Ruff, who would later be responsible for completing the Nuremberg Party Congress Hall left unfinished by his father's death in Nuremberg, in 1934.

See also
 Nazi architecture

External links
Congress Hall

1878 births
1934 deaths
People from Eichstätt (district)
Architects in the Nazi Party
19th-century German architects
20th-century German architects
Bavarian architects